The 1971 Ottawa Rough Riders finished the season in 3rd place in the Eastern Conference with a 6–8 record and lost in the Eastern Semi-Final game to the Hamilton Tiger-Cats.

Preseason

Regular season

Standings

Schedule

Postseason

Player stats

Passing

Awards and honours
 Jerry Campbell, Linebacker, CFL All-Star

References

Ottawa Rough Riders seasons
1971 Canadian Football League season by team